Schröter or Schroeter is a German surname, a variant of Schröder (in Silesia Saxony and Thuringia ).  It may also be written without diacritics as Schroter.  It is an occupational name for a cloth cutter or tailor. Notable people with the surname include:

 Adam Schröter, Silesian humanist, poet, and alchemist
Albrecht Schröter (born 1955), German politician
 Carl Joseph Schröter (18551939), Swiss botanist
 Charles Schroeter (18371921), American soldier
Corona Schröter (17511802), German actress and singer
 Erich Schröter (19041942), German military officer
Eva Bulling-Schröter (born 1956), German politician
 Felix Schröter (born 1996), German footballer
 Günter Schröter (19272016), German footballer and coach
 Harm G. Schroeter (active from 1981), Norwegian academic in economic history
 Heide Schröter (active 1967), West German slalom canoeist
 Heinrich Schröter (182992), German mathematician
 Horst von Schroeter (19192006), German U-boat commander
 Jens Fredrik Schroeter (18571927), Norwegian astronomer
 Johann Hieronymus Schröter (17451816), German astronomer
 Johann Samuel Schröter (17351808), German Protestant theologian and conchologist
 Johann Samuel Schröter (c.1752–1788), German pianist and composer
 Joseph Schröter (183794), German mycologist
 Karl Schröter (19051977), German mathematician and logician
 Karl-Ernst Schroeter (191243), German naval officer who fought in World War II
 Karl-Heinz Schröter (born 1954), German politician
 Leonhardt Schröter, German choirmaster, teacher and composer
 Martina Schröter (born 1960), German rower
 Moritz Schröter (1851–1925), German industrial engineer
 Morris Schröter (born 1995), German footballer
 Rebecca Schroeter (17511826), British musician
 Reginald Schroeter (19212002), Canadian ice hockey player
 Silvio Schröter (born 1979), German football player
 Susanne Schröter (born 1957), German social anthropologist
 Tobias Schröter (born 1964), East German pair skater
 Victor Schröter (18391901), Russian architect
 Werner Schroeter (19452010), German film director
 Wilhelm Schröter (born 1960), Brazilian composer and pianist

See also
 
 

German-language surnames
Occupational surnames